Kenneth 'Monkey' Sellar (11 August 1906 – 15 May 1989) was an English sportsman who represented the England national rugby union team and played first-class cricket for Sussex.

As a right-handed specialist batsman, Sellar appeared in 19 first-class matches and made 616 runs at 19.87. Many of those matches were with Sussex but he also played for the Royal Navy Cricket Club. He made just one century in his career, an innings of 119 in a County Championship match against Somerset in Hove.

He was better known as a rugby player and out of his seven caps, six were in Five Nations and the other came when England defeated Australia at Twickenham. He was a member of the 1928 Five Nations Championship team which won the triple crown.

Sellar was also a celebrated commander in the Royal Navy and took part in Operation Infatuate and the Allied invasion of Sicily.

Having been brought up in South Africa, Sellar returned there in the 1980s and was living in Cape Town when he died in 1989.

References

External links
Cricinfo: Kenneth Sellar

1906 births
1989 deaths
English rugby union players
England international rugby union players
English cricketers
Sussex cricketers
Rugby union players from Lewisham
Combined Services cricketers
Royal Navy cricketers
Marylebone Cricket Club cricketers
Royal Navy officers of World War II
H. D. G. Leveson Gower's XI cricketers
Rugby union fullbacks